Tool use by animals is a phenomenon in which an animal uses any kind of tool in order to achieve a goal such as acquiring food and water, grooming, defence, communication, recreation or construction. Originally thought to be a skill possessed only by humans, some tool use requires a sophisticated level of cognition. There is considerable discussion about the definition of what constitutes a tool and therefore which behaviours can be considered true examples of tool use. A wide range of animals, including mammals, birds, fish, cephalopods, and insects, are considered to use tools.

Primates are well known for using tools for hunting or gathering food and water, cover for rain, and self-defence. Chimpanzees have often been the object of study in regard to their usage of tools, most famously by Jane Goodall, since these animals are frequently kept in captivity and are closely related to humans. Wild tool use in other primates, especially among apes and monkeys, is considered relatively common, though its full extent remains poorly documented, as many primates in the wild are mainly only observed distantly or briefly when in their natural environments and living without human influence. Some novel tool-use by primates may arise in a localised or isolated manner within certain unique primate cultures, being transmitted and practised among socially connected primates through cultural learning. Many famous researchers, such as Charles Darwin in his book The Descent of Man, have mentioned tool use in monkeys (such as baboons).

Among other mammals, both wild and captive elephants are known to create tools using their trunks and feet, mainly for swatting flies, scratching, plugging up waterholes that they have dug (to close them up again so the water does not evaporate), and reaching food that is out of reach. In addition to primates and elephants, many other social mammals particularly have been observed engaging in tool use. A group of dolphins in Shark Bay uses sea sponges to protect their beaks while foraging. Sea otters will use rocks or other hard objects to dislodge food (such as abalone) and break open shellfish. Many or most mammals of the order Carnivora have been observed using tools, often to trap or break open the shells of prey, as well as for scratching.

Corvids (such as crows, ravens and rooks) are well known for their large brains (among birds) and tool use. New Caledonian crows are among the only animals that create their own tools. They mainly manufacture probes out of twigs and wood (and sometimes metal wire) to catch or impale larvae. Tool use in some birds may be best exemplified in nest intricacy. Tailorbirds manufacture 'pouches' to make their nests in. Some birds, such as weaver birds, build complex nests utilising a diverse array of objects and materials, many of which are specifically chosen by certain birds for their unique qualities. Woodpecker finches insert twigs into trees in order to catch or impale larvae. Parrots may use tools to wedge nuts so that they can crack open the outer shell of nuts without launching away the inner contents. Some birds take advantage of human activity, such as carrion crows in Japan, which drop nuts in front of cars to crack them open.

Several species of fish use tools to hunt and crack open shellfish, extract food that is out of reach, or clear an area for nesting. Among cephalopods (and perhaps uniquely or to an extent unobserved among invertebrates), octopuses are known to utilise tools relatively frequently, such as gathering coconut shells to create a shelter or using rocks to create barriers.

Definitions and terminology
The key to identifying tool use is defining what constitutes a tool. Researchers of animal behaviour have arrived at different formulations.

In 1981, Beck published a widely used definition of tool use. This has been modified to:

Other, briefer definitions have been proposed:

Others, for example Lawick-Goodall, distinguish between "tool use" and "object use".

Different terms have been given to the tool according to whether the tool is altered by the animal. If the "tool" is not held or manipulated by the animal in any way, such as an immobile anvil, objects in a bowerbird's bower, or a bird using bread as bait to catch fish, it is sometimes referred to as a "proto-tool".

When an animal uses a tool that acts on another tool, this has been termed use of a "meta-tool". For example, New Caledonian crows will spontaneously use a short tool to obtain an otherwise inaccessible longer tool that then allows them to extract food from a hole. Similarly, bearded capuchin monkeys will use smaller stones to loosen bigger quartz pebbles embedded in conglomerate rock, which they subsequently use as tools.

Rarely, animals may use one tool followed by another, for example, bearded capuchins use stones and sticks, or two stones. This is called "associative", "secondary" or "sequential" tool use.

Some animals use other individuals in a way which could be interpreted as tool use, for example, ants crossing water over a bridge of other ants, or weaver ants using conspecifics to glue leaves together. These have been termed "social tools".

Borderline examples

Play
Play has been defined as "activity having no immediate benefits and structurally including repetitive or exaggerated actions that may be out of sequence or disordered". When play is discussed in relation to manipulating objects, it is often used in association with the word "tool". Some birds, notably crows, parrots and birds of prey, "play" with objects, many of them playing in flight with such items as stones, sticks and leaves, by letting them go and catching them again before they reach the ground. A few species repeatedly drop stones, apparently for the enjoyment of the sound effects. Many other species of animals, both avian and non-avian, play with objects in a similar manner.

Fixed "devices"
The impaling of prey on thorns by many of the shrikes (Laniidae) is well known. Several other birds may use spines or forked sticks to anchor a carcass while they flay it with the bill. It has been concluded that "This is an example of a fixed device which serves as an extension of the body, in this case, talons" and is thus a true form of tool use. On the other hand, the use of fixed skewers may not be true tool-use because the thorn (or whatever) is not manipulated by the bird. Leopards perform a similar behaviour by dragging carcasses up trees and caching them in the forks of branches.

Use of bait
Several species of bird, including herons such as the striated heron (Butorides striatus), will place bread in water to attract fish. Whether this is tool use is disputed because the bread is not manipulated or held by the bird.

Captive orcas have been observed baiting and catching a bird with a regurgitated fish, as well as showing similar behaviour in the wild.

Learning and cognition
Tool use by animals may indicate different levels of learning and cognition. For some animals, tool use is largely instinctive and inflexible. For example, the woodpecker finch of the Galápagos Islands use twigs or spines as an essential and regular part of its foraging behaviour, but these behaviours are often quite inflexible and are not applied effectively in different situations. The mechanisms driving other tool use, e.g. chimpanzee tool-use, are still debated. Whilst some may argue that behaviours such as using twigs to "fish" for termites, may be developed by watching others use tools and may even be a true example of animal teaching, studies with captive chimpanzees have found that many of these species-typical behaviours (including termite fishing) are individually learnt by each chimpanzee. Tools may even be used in solving puzzles in which the animal appears to experience a "Eureka moment".

In mammals

Primates

Tool use has been reported many times in both wild and captive primates, particularly the great apes. The use of tools by primates is varied and includes hunting (mammals, invertebrates, fish), collecting honey, processing food (nuts, fruits, vegetables and seeds), collecting water, weapons and shelter.

Tool manufacture is much rarer than simple tool use and probably represents higher cognitive functioning. Soon after her initial discovery of tool use, Goodall observed other chimpanzees picking up leafy twigs, stripping off the leaves and using the stems to fish for insects. This change of a leafy twig into a tool was a major discovery. Prior to this, scientists thought that only humans manufactured and used tools, and that this ability was what separated humans from other animals. In 1990, it was claimed the only primate to manufacture tools in the wild was the chimpanzee. However, since then, several primates have been reported as tool makers in the wild.

Both bonobos and chimpanzees have been observed making "sponges" out of leaves and moss that suck up water and using these for grooming. Sumatran orangutans will take a live branch, remove twigs and leaves and sometimes the bark, before fraying or flattening the tip for use on ants or bees. In the wild, mandrills have been observed to clean their ears with modified tools. Scientists filmed a large male mandrill at Chester Zoo (UK) stripping down a twig, apparently to make it narrower, and then using the modified stick to scrape dirt from underneath his toenails. Captive gorillas have made a variety of tools.

Chimpanzees and bonobos
Chimpanzees are sophisticated tool users with behaviours including cracking nuts with stone tools and fishing for ants or termites with sticks. These chimpanzees not only use these sticks to fish out their meal, but they in fact build their own 'tool kits' to do so, as observed in the Republic of Congo. They first use a smaller stick to break open the termite or ant mound, then use a large stick to make holes in the prey's colony, and then insert a 'fishing probe' into the hole and pull out all the termites or ants that have gathered on the stick. There are more limited reports of the closely related bonobo (Pan paniscus) using tools in the wild; it has been claimed they rarely use tools in the wild although they use tools as readily as chimpanzees when in captivity, It has been reported that females of both chimpanzees and bonobos use tools more avidly than males. Wild chimpanzees predominantly use tools in the context of food acquisition, while wild bonobos appear to use tools mainly for personal care (cleaning, protection from rain) and social purposes. Wild bonobos have been observed using leaves as cover for rain, or the use of branches in social displays.

Hunting
Research in 2007 showed that common chimpanzees sharpen sticks to use as weapons when hunting mammals. This is considered the first evidence of systematic use of weapons in a species other than humans. Researchers documented 22 occasions when wild chimpanzees on a savanna in Senegal fashioned sticks into "spears" to hunt lesser bushbabies (Galago senegalensis). In each case, a chimpanzee modified a branch by breaking off one or two ends and, frequently using its teeth, sharpened the stick. The tools, on average, were about 60 cm (24 in) long and 1.1 cm (0.4 in) in circumference. The chimpanzee then jabbed the spear into hollows in tree trunks where bushbabies sleep. There was a single case in which a chimpanzee successfully extracted a bushbaby with the tool. It has been suggested that the word "spear" is an overstatement that makes the chimpanzees seem too much like early humans, and that the term "bludgeon" is more accurate, since the point of the tool may not be particularly sharp. This behaviour was seen more frequently in females, particularly adolescent females, and young chimps in general, than in adult males.

Chimpanzees often eat the marrow of long bones of colobus monkeys with the help of small sticks, after opening the ends of the bones with their teeth. A juvenile female was observed to eat small parts of the brain of an intact skull that she could not break open by inserting a small stick through the foramen magnum. On another occasion, an adult female used three sticks to clean the orbits of a colobus monkey skull after she had just eaten the eyes.

In Gombe National Park in 1960, Jane Goodall observed a chimpanzee, David Greybeard, poking pieces of grass into a termite mound and then raising the grass to his mouth. After he left, Goodall approached the mound and repeated the behaviour because she was unsure what David was doing. She found that the termites bit onto the grass with their jaws. David had been using the grass as a tool to "fish" or "dip" for termites. Soon after this initial discovery of tool use, Goodall observed David and other chimpanzees picking up leafy twigs, stripping off the leaves, and using the stems to fish for insects. This modification of a leafy twig into a tool was a major discovery: previously, scientists thought that only humans made and used tools, and that this was what separated humans from other animals.

Other studies of the Gombe chimps show that young females and males learn to fish for termites differently. Female chimps learn to fish for termites earlier and better than the young males. Females also spend more time fishing while at the mounds with their mothers—males spend more time playing. When they are adults, females need more termite protein because with young to care for, they cannot hunt the way males can.

Populations differ in the prevalence of tool use for fishing for invertebrates. Chimpanzees in the Tai National Park only sometimes use tools, whereas Gombe chimpanzees rely almost exclusively on tools for their intake of driver ants. This may be due to difference in the rewards gained by tool use: Gombe chimpanzees collect 760 ants/min compared to 180 ants/min for the Tai chimpanzees.

Some chimpanzees use tools to hunt large bees (Xylocopa sp.) which make nests in dead branches on the ground or in trees. To get to the grubs and the honey, the chimpanzee first tests for the presence of adults by probing the nest entrance with a stick. If present, adult bees block the entrance with their abdomens, ready to sting. The chimpanzee then disables them with the stick to make them fall out and eats them rapidly. Afterwards, the chimpanzee opens the branch with its teeth to obtain the grubs and the honey.

Chimpanzees have even been observed using two tools: a stick to dig into an ant nest and a "brush" made from grass stems with their teeth to collect the ants.

Collecting honey
Honey of four bee species is eaten by chimpanzees. Groups of chimpanzees fish with sticks for the honey after having tried to remove what they can with their hands. They usually extract with their hands honeycombs from undisturbed hives of honey bees and run away from the bees to quietly eat their catch. In contrast, hives that have already been disturbed, either through the falling of the tree or because of the intervention of other predators, are cleaned of the remaining honey with fishing tools.

Processing food

Tai chimpanzees crack open nuts with rocks, but there is no record of Gombe chimpanzees using rocks in this way. After opening nuts by pounding with a hammer, parts of the kernels may be too difficult to reach with the teeth or fingernails, and some individuals use sticks to remove these remains, instead of pounding the nut further with the hammer as other individuals do: a relatively rare combination of using two different tools. Hammers for opening nuts may be either wood or stone.

Collecting water
When chimpanzees cannot reach water that has formed in hollows high up inside trees, they have been observed taking a handful of leaves, chewing them, and dipping this "sponge" into the pool to suck out the water. Both bonobos and chimpanzees have also been observed making "sponges" out of leaves and moss that suck up water and are used as grooming tools.

Orangutans
Orangutans were first observed using tools in the wild in 1994 in the northwest corner of Sumatra. As with the chimpanzees, orangutans use tools made from branches and leaves to scratch, scrape, wipe, sponge, swat, fan, hook, probe, scoop, pry, chisel, hammer, cover, cushion and amplify. They will break off a tree branch that is about 30 cm long, snap off the twigs, fray one end and then use the stick to dig in tree holes for termites. Sumatran orangutans use a variety of tools—up to 54 types for extracting insects or honey, and as many as 20 types for opening or preparing fruits such as the hard to access Neesia Malayana. They also use an 'autoerotic tool'—a stick which they use to stimulate the genitals and masturbate (both male and female). There have been reports that individuals in both captivity and in the wild use tools held between the lips or teeth, rather than in the hands. In captivity, orangutans have been taught to chip stone to make and use Oldowan tools.

Orangutans living in Borneo scavenge fish that wash up along the shore and scoop catfish out of small ponds for fresh meals. Over two years, anthropologist Anne Russon observed orangutans learning to jab sticks at catfish to scare them out of the ponds and in to their waiting hands. Although orangutans usually fished alone, Russon observed pairs of apes catching catfish on a few occasions. On the island of Kaja in Borneo, a male orangutan was observed using a pole apparently trying to spear or bludgeon fish. This individual had seen humans fishing with spears. Although not successful, he was later able to improvise by using the pole to catch fish already trapped in the locals' fishing lines.

Sumatran orangutans use sticks to acquire seeds from a particular fruit. When the fruit of the Neesia tree ripens, its hard, ridged husk softens until it falls open. Inside are seeds that are highly desirable to the orangutans, but they are surrounded by fibreglass-like hairs that are painful if eaten. A Neesia-eating orangutan will select a 12 cm stick, strip off the bark, and then carefully collect the hairs with it. Once the fruit is safe, the ape will eat the seeds using the stick or its fingers. Sumatran orangutans will use a stick to poke a bees' nest wall, move it around and catch the honey.

Orangutans have been observed using sticks to apparently measure the depth of water. It has been reported that orangutans use tools for a wide range of purposes including using leaves as protective gloves or napkins, using leafy branches to swat insects or gather water, and building sun or rain covers above the nests used for resting. It has been reported that a Sumatran orangutan used a large leaf as an umbrella in a tropical rainstorm.

Orangutans produce an alarm call known as a "kiss squeak" when they encounter a predator like a snake. Sometimes, orangutans will strip leaves from a branch and hold them in front of their mouth when making the sound. It has been found this lowers the maximum frequency of the sound i.e. makes it deeper, and in addition, smaller orangutans are more likely to use the leaves. It has been suggested they use the leaves to make themselves sound bigger than they really are, the first documented case of an animal using a tool to manipulate sound.

Gorillas

There are few reports of gorillas using tools in the wild. Western lowland gorillas have been observed using sticks to apparently measure the depth of water and as "walking sticks" to support their posture when crossing deeper water. An adult female used a detached trunk from a small shrub as a stabiliser during food gathering, and another used a log as a bridge. One possible explanation for the absence of observed tool use in wild gorillas is that they are less dependent on foraging techniques that require the use of tools, since they exploit food resources differently from chimpanzees. Whereas chimpanzees and orangutans feeding involves tools such as hammers to crack open nuts and sticks to fish for termites, gorillas access these foods by breaking nuts with their teeth and smashing termite mounds with their hands.

Captive western lowland gorillas have been observed to threaten each other with sticks and larger pieces of wood, while others use sticks for hygienic purposes. Some females have attempted to use logs as ladders. In another group of captive gorillas, several individuals were observed throwing sticks and branches into a tree, apparently to knock down leaves and seeds. Gorillas at Prague zoo have used tools in several ways, including using wood wool as "slippers" when walking on the snow or to cross a wet section of the floor.

Monkeys

Tool use has been observed in at least 32 monkey species  including individuals that are captive, free, and semi-free range. These observations entail established, long term use of tools such as baboons using items to hit humans as well as more elusive, rare use like the howler monkeys’ use of leaves to treat wounds. Use is further nuanced by if a species uses objects they have found or objects that they have modified. Of the 32 species that exhibit tool use, 11 of these exhibit object modification to make tools.

In a captive environment, capuchins readily insert a stick into a tube containing viscous food that clings to the stick, which they then extract and lick. Capuchins also use a stick to push food from the centre of a tube retrieving the food when it reaches the far end, and as a rake to sweep objects or food toward themselves. The black-striped capuchin (Sapajus libidinosus) was the first non-ape primate for which tool use was documented in the wild; individuals were observed cracking nuts by placing them on a stone anvil and hitting them with another large stone (hammer). Similar hammer-and-anvil use has been observed in other wild capuchins including robust capuchin monkeys (genus Sapajus) It may take a capuchin up to 8 years to master this skill. The monkeys often transport hard fruits, stones, nuts and even oysters to an anvil for this purpose. Capuchins also use stones as digging tools for probing the substrate and sometimes for excavating tubers. Wild black-striped capuchin use sticks to flush prey from inside rock crevices. Robust capuchins are also known to sometimes rub defensive secretions from arthropods over their bodies before eating them; such secretions are believed to act as natural insecticides.

Baboons have also exhibited extensive tool use, seen within research on the chacma baboon (Papio ursinus) troops living on the desert floor of the Kuiseb Canyon in South West Africa. These baboons intentionally dropped stones over cliffs. Researchers have seen other types of tool use such as raking with tools and the use of barrels to climb in baboons.

Scientists have observed mandrills to modify and then use tools within captive environments.

In long-tailed macaques, tool use has been extensively observed, particularly within foraging and grooming habits. These tools have both been synthetic and organic in origin and their use varies greatly depending on populations. The research done within these populations and their tool use has been used to draw conclusions that high levels of sensorimotor intelligence help evolve innovative tool use.

Limitations of primate tool use

The above examples reveal plentiful examples of primate tool use. However, it is important to recognise that nonhuman primates, compared with humans, have inherent limitations in their tool complexity, due to limitations in the ways in which the innovations underlying these complexities are constructed. Unlike human tools, which increase in complexity due to continuing cultural evolution, nonhuman primates' tool complexity is biologically restricted to those within what has been dubbed zone(s) of latent solutions. Tools within this zone can be individually and socially learned (triggered), but tools outside this zone cannot. This renders non-human primates unable to improve their tools in complexity beyond this zone, towards levels of human technology.

Zone of latent solutions 
Every animal navigates their material environment through the lens of their biological predispositions and exaptations. With the example of primates using tools, it is necessary to consider the biological setting in which each primate species interacts with their tools. Every primate innately possesses a zone of solutions to ecological problems that can develop in interaction with a given environment, known as their zone of latent solutions. This package of skills can be a tight fit for the primate's environment - through adaptations and/or exaptations - and contain packages of potential solutions within the primate's existing and potential behaviour. Tool use within this zone can likewise be expressed via genetic predispositions, through trial and error learning, and all this may be triggered by social learning but without this social learning transmitting these skills themselves. All this may lead some to the conclusion that all primates have a human-like capacity to copy abilities to make and/or use complex tools from each other. However, nonhuman primate tool use is likely constrained to those tools within each species' zone of latent solutions - unless human training expands this zone.

For example, every chimpanzee has the capacity to learn how to use tools such as nut cracking and poking sticks to capture and consume ants. These behaviours are likely in the chimpanzees' ZLS, and therefore belong to every chimpanzee’s potential biological toolkit. Yet, many may require a social "push", i.e. a trigger, before they themselves develop this behaviour (individually). However, chimpanzees, and every other great ape, seem to be unable to learn tool use behaviour outside of their ZLS - i.e. in cases where a behaviour would not just be triggered, but copied. For example, no species of great ape apart from humans (including chimpanzees, gorillas and orangutans) are able to spontaneously produce loop-like technology under any condition, even with human teaching. Since loops fall securely outside of great apes’ ZLS—perhaps as there was never any use for this behaviour in their ecological environment—this behaviour is unable to be learned socially by non-human primates.

The role of culture in primate tool use 
Humans navigate our material world through the lens of cultural learning. Cultural learning is defined as high-complexity social learning, where tools and behaviours are invented on top of previous inventions which have previously been copied and taught - leading to cultural refinement across generations via the so-called cultural ratchet effect. As cultural animals, we regularly invent new tools based on our acquired cultural background, we may pay attention to specific models, such as the most successful individuals (and various other social learning biases), and in this way the best tool practices may increase in frequency and stick around in our collective repertoire until better designed ones are built on top. This cultural learning allows human tool complexity and efficiency to “ratchet up” through cultural generations, building tools of increased complexity over time, which allows the products (behaviours and/or artefacts) to accumulate over time in a process known as “cumulative culture.” Nonhuman primate tools, contrarily, are unable to ratchet up in complexity over time as these animals do not copy tool design that they themselves could not have independently created from scratch, and therefore primates other than humans are restricted to those tools that reside within their zone(s) of latent solutions.

While human tools and technologies currently still increase in complexity at an exponential rate, for instance evolving from stone tools to rocket ships and supercomputers within a few thousand years, nonhuman primate tools show little evidence of improvement or underlying technological change in their underlying know-how across generations. For example, archaeological evidence indicates that the basic chimpanzee nut-cracking know-how has been static for at least the past 4300 years. This consistency and stasis in tool behaviour suggests that chimpanzee tools are not refined or improved across generations with a ratcheting-up effect, but rather reinvented by every single chimpanzee generation. That is, non-human primates must "re-invent the wheel" at every generation anew.

Humans differ from nonhuman primates in how we perceive tools and their underlying know-how. Humans, as a cultural species, are predisposed to copy the know-how (methods, relationships and processes) behind tools, while our nonhuman primate relatives are predisposed to instead individually innovate their tools from scratch or to be merely socially triggered to re-innovate the tools used by others (who, ultimately had to innovate them from scratch). For example, when both human children and chimpanzees (both aged 2-4 years) are shown solutions to open a box with observably unnecessary steps involved, human children consistently copy even the unnecessary steps, while chimpanzees bypass unnecessary steps and go straightforwardly to their natural tendencies of engaging with the box, such as using a stick to poke it. This difference between chimpanzees and humans suggests that chimpanzees tend to see tools through the lens of their own individual approaches, while humans tend to see tools through the lens of the underlying know-how, even where their own tendencies mismatch the observed know-how. Nonhuman primates are predisposed to re-innovate technologies that already exist in their zone of latent solutions, while, as a cumulative cultural species, humans learn know-how culturally that clearly is beyond the human zone of latent solutions. Over time, and across generations, this has led humans to have culturally created billions of know-how types, with the vast majority being beyond the human zone of latent solutions. Other apes, in contrast, seem to draw from a range of know-how that counts in mere thousands.

While humans and nonhuman primates are both tool users, both their expression and their capacities for tool use are vastly different. The zone(s) of latent solutions of nonhuman primates, and the cultural ratcheting-up of human technology rest on different underlying processes with vastly different capacities for complexity and improvement over time. While humans copy know-how that is supraindividual, other primates do not. It is currently unclear whether the zone of latent solutions approach is restricted to non-human primates, or whether it may help explain also tool use in many (or all) other animals. One step towards determining whether other animals' tool use is likely based on latent solutions or is instead due to cultural evolution of know-how is to determine - for each species examined - whether similar tool use exists in more than one population of the same species, where these populations are culturally unconnected (the so-called "method of local restriction" ). Whenever similar tool use shows in such culturally unconnected populations of the same species, this makes it more likely that the tool behaviour is a latent solution. Likewise, if the same tool use appears in one or more populations of one or more closely related species, this is some (more indirect) evidence that it is a latent solution - in all the related species in which it is shown.

Elephants

Elephants show an ability to manufacture and use tools with their trunk and feet. Both wild and captive Asian elephants (Elephas maximus) use branches to swat flies or scratch themselves. Eight of 13 captive Asian elephants, maintained under a naturalistic environment, modified branches and switched with the altered branch, indicating this species is capable of the more rare behaviour of tool manufacture. There were different styles of modification of the branches, the most common of which was holding the main stem with the front foot and pulling off a side branch or distal end with the trunk. Elephants have been observed digging holes to drink water, then ripping bark from a tree, chewing it into the shape of a ball thereby manufacturing a "plug" to fill in the hole, and covering it with sand to avoid evaporation. They would later go back to the spot to drink.

Asian elephants may use tools in insightful problem solving. A captive male was observed moving a box to a position where it could be stood upon to reach food that had been deliberately hung out of reach.

Elephants have also been known to drop large rocks onto an electric fence to either ruin the fence or cut off the electricity.

Cetaceans

A community of Indo-Pacific bottlenose dolphins (Tursiops sp.) in Shark Bay, Western Australia, made up of approximately 41-54 animals, are known to use conical sponges (Echinodictyum mesenterinum) as tools while foraging. This behaviour, termed "sponging", occurs when a dolphin breaks off a sponge and wears it over its rostrum while foraging on the seafloor. Sponging behaviour typically begins in the second year of life. During sponging, dolphins mainly target fish that lack swim bladders and burrow in the substrate. Therefore, the sponge may be used to protect their rostrums as they forage in a niche where echolocation and vision are less effective hunting techniques. Dolphins tend to carry the same sponge for multiple surfacings but sometimes change sponges. Spongers typically are more solitary, take deeper dives, and spend more time foraging than non-spongers. Despite these costs, spongers have similar calving success to non-spongers.

There is evidence that both ecological and cultural factors predict which dolphins use sponges as tools. Sponging occurs more frequently in areas with higher distribution of sponges, which tends to occur in deeper water channels. Sponging is heavily sex-biased to females. Genetic analyses suggest that all spongers are descendants of a single matriline, suggesting cultural transmission of the use of sponges as tools. Sponging may be socially learned from mother to offspring. Social grouping behaviour suggests homophily (the tendency to associate with similar others) among dolphins that share socially learned skills such as sponge tool use. Sponging has only been observed in Shark Bay.

Indo-Pacific bottlenose dolphins in Shark Bay have also been observed carrying conch shells. In this behaviour, dolphins insert their rostrum into the shell's aperture. Although this behaviour is rare, it appears to be used for foraging. Dolphins appear to use the conch shells to scoop fish from the substrate then carry the shell to retrieve the fish near the surface.

Sea otters

Under each foreleg, the sea otter (Enhydra lutris) has a loose pouch of skin that extends across the chest. In this pouch (preferentially the left side), the animal stores collected food to bring to the surface. This pouch also holds a rock, unique to the otter, that is used to break open shellfish and clams. To open hard shells, it may pound its prey with both paws against the rock which it places on its chest. Furthermore, sea otters will use large stones to pry an abalone off its rock; they will hammer the abalone shell with observed rates of 45 blows in 15 seconds or 180 rpm, and do it in two or three dives. Releasing an abalone, which can cling to rock with a force equal to 4,000 times its own body weight, requires multiple dives by the otter. Furthermore, out of the thirteen currently known species of otters, at least 10 demonstrate stone handling behaviour, suggesting that otters may have a genetic predisposition to manipulate stones.

Other carnivores
Wild banded mongooses (Mungos mungo) regularly use anvils to open food items with a hard shell such as rhinoceros beetles, bird eggs, snail shells or pupating dung beetles. They use a range of anvils commonly including rocks and the stems of trees, but will also use the side-walls of gullys and even dried elephant dung. Pups as young as 2 months of age are already showing the behavioural patterns associated with using an anvil, however, successful smashing is usually shown in individuals older than 6 months of age.

Honey badgers both wild and captive have been filmed manipulating various objects to assist them in making climbs, including making mud balls and stacking them.

North American badgers (Taxidea taxus) hunt Richardson's ground squirrels (Spermophilus richardsonii). The most common hunting technique is excavation of burrow systems, but plugging of openings into ground-squirrel tunnels accounts for 5–23% of hunting actions. Badgers usually use soil from around the tunnel opening, or soil dragged 30–270 cm from a nearby mound to plug tunnels. The least common (6%), but most novel, form of plugging used by 1 badger involved movement of 37 objects from distances of 20–105 cm to plug openings into 23 ground-squirrel tunnels on 14 nights.

In 2011, researchers at the Dingo Discovery and Research Centre in Melbourne, Australia, filmed a dingo manipulating a table and using this to get food.

Molting brown bears in Alaska have been observed using rocks to exfoliate. There is also evidence that polar bears throw rocks and big pieces of ice at walruses to kill them.

Other mammals
A family of captive Visayan warty pigs have been observed using a flat piece of bark as a digging tool. Horses have also been observed using different tools.

In birds

Tool use is found in at least thirty-three different families of birds. According to Jones and Kamil's definition, a bearded vulture dropping a bone on a rock would not be considered using a tool since the rock cannot be seen as an extension of the body. However, the use of a rock manipulated using the beak to crack an ostrich egg would qualify the Egyptian vulture as a tool user. Many other species, including parrots, corvids and a range of passerines, have been noted as tool users.

Many birds (and other animals) build nests. It can be argued that this behaviour constitutes tool use according to the definitions given above; the birds "carry objects (twigs, leaves) for future use", the shape of the formed nest prevents the eggs from rolling away and thereby "extends the physical influence realized by the animal", and the twigs are bent and twisted to shape the nest, i.e. "modified to fit a purpose". The complexity of bird nests varies markedly, perhaps indicating a range in the sophistication of tool use. For example, compare the highly complex structures of weaver birds to the simple mats of herbaceous matter with a central cup constructed by gulls, and it is noteworthy that some birds do not build nests, e.g. emperor penguins. The classification of nests as tools has been disputed on the basis that the completed nest, or burrow, is not held or manipulated.

Prey-dropping behaviour is seen in many species of birds. Species of crows such as Carrion, Northwestern, American, and New Caledonian crows exhibit this behaviour using different prey. Gulls, particularly Kelp, Western, Black-Headed and Sooty gulls are also known to drop mussels from a height as a foraging adaptation. This behaviour is demonstrated by dropping prey from a height onto a hard substrate in order to break the prey's shell open. Several variables such as prey size, substrate type, kleptoparasitism, etc. can influence the behaviour of prey dropping in various species.

Finches
Perhaps the best known and most studied example of an avian tool user is the woodpecker finch (Camarhynchus pallidus) from the Galápagos Islands. If the bird uncovers prey in bark which is inaccessible, the bird then flies off to fetch a cactus spine which it may use in one of three different ways: as a goad to drive out an active insect (without necessarily touching it); as a spear with which to impale a slow-moving larva or similar animal; or as an implement with which to push, bring towards, nudge or otherwise maneuver an inactive insect from a crevice or hole. Tools that do not exactly fit the purpose are worked by the bird and adapted for the function, thus making the finch a "tool maker" as well as a "tool user". Some individuals have been observed to use a different type of tool with novel functional features such as barbed twigs from blackberry bushes, a plant that is not native to the islands. The twigs were first modified by removing side twigs and leaves and then used such that the barbs helped drag prey out of tree crevices.

There is a genetic predisposition for tool use in this species, which is then refined by individual trial-and-error learning during a sensitive phase early in development. This means that, rather than following a stereotypical behavioural pattern, tool use can be modified and adapted by learning.

The importance of tool use by woodpecker finch species differs between vegetation zones. In the arid zone, where food is limited and hard to access, tool use is essential, especially during the dry season. Up to half of the finches' prey is acquired with the help of tools, making them even more routine tool users than chimpanzees. The tools allow them to extract large, nutritious insect larvae from tree holes, making tool use more profitable than other foraging techniques. In contrast, in the humid zone, woodpecker finches rarely use tools, since food availability is high and prey is more easily obtainable. Here, the time and energy costs of tool use would be too high.

There have been reported cases of woodpecker finches brandishing a twig as a weapon.

Corvids

Corvids are a family of birds characterised by relatively large brains, remarkable behavioural plasticity (especially highly innovative foraging behaviour) and well-developed cognitive abilities.

Carrion crows

Carrion crows were observed on Eden estuary in Scotland between February and March 1988 to investigate their dropping strategies with mussels. Carrion crows selected larger mussels and dropped them from a height of ~8m onto hard substrate. The height of mussels dropped were lower than what researchers expected, which may be due to difficulty locating prey post dropping as well as trying to prevent kleptoparasitism (stealing of food by other scavengers). Behaviour of prey dropping seen in carrion crows suggest that the size of prey, substrate surfaces, and height drop influence their behaviour. Therefore, it can be inferred that other species may exhibit different behaviour strategies based on their prey, and environment.

Northwestern crows

Different variables such as, prey size, shell breakability, predators, substrate, and height affect the behaviour of prey dropping for different species. For instance, selection of prey may depend on substrate used in that environment. Northwestern crows are another example of birds that drop prey from a height onto the ground. Northwestern crows flew vertically up, releasing whelks and immediately diving after it. Similar to the carrion crows, northwestern crows also preferred larger whelks over smaller ones and selected sizes by sight and weight by picking whelks up with their bill. Unlike Carrion crows, Northwestern crows exhibited a unique response upon releasing prey. After releasing whelks, northwestern crows instantly dove after it whereas carrion crows were not as diligent in following and immediately retrieving prey. This behaviour is likely due to northwestern crows minimising and potentially avoiding kleptoparasitism. It is unclear why carrion crows have a different response to prey being released than northwestern crows, however, these differences in behaviour could potentially be due to higher predation in areas that northwestern crows inhabit, or increase in food sources in areas inhabited by carrion crows.

American crows

American crows are another of several species of birds that possess prey dropping behaviour. When performing the study of prey dropping in American crows, the number of drops to crack a walnut decreased as the height of prey dropped increased and crows had more success when dropping walnuts onto asphalt compared to soil. Prey loss almost always occurred through kleptoparasitism however, there is a lack of evidence that shows kleptoparasitism being directly affected by height of prey dropped.

Caledonian crows
New Caledonian crows (Corvus moneduloides) are perhaps the most studied corvid with respect to tool-use.

In the wild, they have been observed using sticks as tools to extract insects from tree bark. The birds poke the insects or larvae until they bite the stick in defence and can then be drawn out. This "larva fishing" is very similar to the "termite fishing" practised by chimpanzees. In the wild, they also manufacture tools from twigs, grass stems or similar plant structures, whereas captive individuals have been observed to use a variety of materials, including feathers and garden wire. Stick tools can either be non-hooked—being more or less straight and requiring only little modification—or hooked. Construction of the more complex hooked tools typically involves choosing a forked twig from which parts are removed and the remaining end is sculpted and sharpened. New Caledonian crows also use pandanus tools, made from barbed leaf edges of screw pines (Pandanus spp.) by precise ripping and cutting although the function of the pandanus tools is not understood.

While young birds in the wild normally learn to make stick tools from elders, a laboratory New Caledonian crow named "Betty" was filmed spontaneously improvising a hooked tool from a wire. It was known that this individual had no prior experience as she had been hand-reared. New Caledonian crows have been observed to use an easily available small tool to get a less easily available longer tool, and then use this to get an otherwise inaccessible longer tool to get food that was out of reach of the shorter tools. One bird, "Sam", spent 110 seconds inspecting the apparatus before completing each of the steps without any mistakes. This is an example of sequential tool use, which represents a higher cognitive function compared to many other forms of tool use and is the first time this has been observed in non-trained animals. Tool use has been observed in a non-foraging context, providing the first report of multi-context tool use in birds. Captive New Caledonian crows have used stick tools to make first contact with objects that were novel and hence potentially dangerous, while other individuals have been observed using a tool when food was within reach but placed next to a model snake. It has been claimed "Their [New Caledonian crow] tool-making skills exceed those of chimpanzees and are more similar to human tool manufacture than those of any other animal."

New Caledonian crows have also been observed performing tool use behaviour that had hitherto not been described in non-human animals. The behaviour is termed "insert-and-transport tool use". This involves the crow inserting a stick into an object and then walking or flying away holding both the tool and object on the tool.

New Caledonian crows also demonstrate prey dropping behaviour. The first recorded evidence of this species of crow demonstrating prey dropping behaviour on the snail Placostylus fibratus in a 2013 study. New Caledonian crows dropped snails from a particular height onto rocky beds and video recording showed one crow repeating this four times from the same height.

Hawaiian crow
Captive individuals of the critically endangered Hawaiian crow (Corvus hawaiiensis) use tools to extract food from holes drilled in logs. The juveniles exhibit tool use without training or social learning from adults. As 104 of the 109 surviving members of the species were tested, it is believed to be a species-wide ability.

Others
Other corvid species, such as rooks (Corvus frugilegus), can also make and use tools in the laboratory, showing a degree of sophistication similar to that of New Caledonian crows. While not confirmed to have used tools in the wild, captive blue jays (Cyanocitta cristata) have been observed using strips of newspaper as tools to obtain food.

Various corvids have reached for stones to place in a vessel of water so as to raise the surface level to drink from it or access a floating treat, enacting Aesop's Fable of The Crow and the Pitcher.

A wild American crow (Corvus brachyrhynchos) has been observed to modify and use a piece of wood as a probe. Green jays (Cyanocorax yncas) have been observed using sticks as tools to extract insects from tree bark. Large-billed crows in urban Japan have been filmed using an innovative technique to crack hard-shelled nuts by dropping them onto crosswalks (pedestrian crossings) and letting them be run over and cracked by cars. They then retrieve the cracked nuts when the cars are stopped at the red light. In some towns in America, crows drop walnuts onto busy streets so that the cars will crack the nuts. Hooded crows (Corvus cornix) use bait to catch fish. Individuals (who may have observed fish being fed bread by humans) will place the bread in the water to attract fish.

Common ravens (Corvus corax) are one of only a few species who make their own toys. They have been observed breaking off twigs to play with socially. A corvid has been filmed sliding repeatedly down a snow-covered roof while balancing on a lid or tray. Another incidence of play in birds has been filmed showing a corvid playing with a table tennis ball in partnership with a dog, a rare example of tool use for the purposes of play. Blue jays, like other corvids, are highly curious and are considered intelligent birds. Young blue jays playfully snatch brightly coloured or reflective objects, such as bottle caps or pieces of aluminium foil, and carry them around until they lose interest.

Warblers

The tailorbird (genus Orthotomus) takes a large growing leaf (or two or more small ones) and with its sharp bill pierces holes into opposite edges. It then grasps spider silk, silk from cocoons, or plant fibres with its bill, pulls this "thread" through the two holes, and knots it to prevent it from pulling through (although the use of knots is disputed). This process is repeated several times until the leaf or leaves forms a pouch or cup in which the bird then builds its nest. The leaves are sewn together in such a way that the upper surfaces are outwards making the structure difficult to see. The punctures made on the edge of the leaves are minute and do not cause browning of the leaves, further aiding camouflage. The processes used by the tailorbird have been classified as sewing, rivetting, lacing and matting. Once the stitch is made, the fibres fluff out on the outside and in effect they are more like rivets. Sometimes the fibres from one rivet are extended into an adjoining puncture and appear more like sewing. There are many variations in the nest and some may altogether lack the cradle of leaves. It is believed that only the female performs this sewing behaviour. The Latin binomial name of the common tailorbird, Orthotomus sutorius, means "straight-edged" "cobbler" rather than tailor. Some birds of the genus Prinia also practise this sewing and stitching behaviour.

Brown-headed nuthatches
Brown-headed nuthatches (Sitta pusilla) have been observed to methodically use bark pieces to remove other flakes of bark from a tree. The birds insert the bark piece underneath an attached bark scale, using it like a wedge and lever, to expose hiding insects. Occasionally, they reuse the same piece of bark several times and sometimes even fly short distances carrying the bark flake in their beak. The evolutionary origin of this tool use might be related to these birds frequently wedging seeds into cracks in the bark to hammer them open with their beak, which can lead to bark coming off.

Brown-headed nuthatches have used a bark flake to conceal a seed cache.

Crested lark
A Crested lark (Galerida cristata) has been photographed apparently holding in its bill a stone chip it was reportedly using to dislodge prey from paving joints.

Parrots
Kea, a highly inquisitive New Zealand mountain parrot, have been filmed stripping twigs and inserting them into gaps in box-like stoat traps to trigger them. Apparently, the kea's only reward is the banging sound of the trap being set off. In a similarly rare example of tool preparation, a captive Tanimbar corella (Cacatua goffiniana) was observed breaking off and "shaping" splinters of wood and small sticks to create rakes that were then used to retrieve otherwise unavailable food items on the other side of the aviary mesh. This behaviour has been filmed.

Many owners of household parrots have observed their pets using various tools to scratch various parts of their bodies. These tools include discarded feathers, bottle caps, popsicle sticks, matchsticks, cigarette packets and nuts in their shells.

Hyacinth macaws (Anodorhynchus hyacinthinus) have been repeatedly observed to use tools when breaking open nuts, for example, pieces of wood being used as a wedge. Several birds have wrapped a piece of leaf around a nut to hold it in place. This behaviour is also shown by palm cockatoos (Probosciger aterrimus). It seems that the hyacinth macaw has an innate tendency to use tools during manipulation of nuts, as naïve juveniles tried out a variety of objects in combination with nuts.

Tool use behaviour has been observed in the kea, wherein a bird named Bruce, who has a broken upper beak, wedged pebbles between his tongue and lower mandible and then utilised this arrangement to aid with his preening habits.

Tool use behaviour has been observed in the Tanimbar corella in captivity. It was reported in November 2012 by Professor Alice Aursperg of the University of Vienna, that a cock bird named Figaro was observed spontaneously shaping splinters of wood and small sticks in order to create rakes that were then utilised to extend his reach and retrieve otherwise unavailable food items located upon the other side of his aviary mesh.

In July 2013, the results of a joint study involving scientists from University of Oxford, the University of Vienna and the Max Planck Institute, again involving the Tanimbar corellas of the Vienna Goffin Lab, were announced. It was discovered that the birds possessed the ability to solve complex mechanical problems, in one case spontaneously working out how to open a five-part locking mechanism in sequence to retrieve a food item. The corellas were able to very quickly adapt their behaviour and again open the lock when the mechanism sections were modified or re-ordered, demonstrating an apparent concept of working towards a particular goal and knowledge of the way in which physical objects act upon each other – rather than merely an ability to repeat a learned sequence of actions.

Further research in 2020 by Auersperg's team compared the problem-solving ability of the captive-bred Goffins at the Goffin Lab with wild birds caught in Tanimbar and exposed to the same experimental conditions - in which the birds were placed in an "innovation arena" and presented a series of 20 different tasks (e.g. pressing a button, turning a wheel, pulling out a drawer, removing a twig, overturning a cup, opening a clip, etc.) which they could choose to partake in, in order to obtain a food reward. It was found that while the wild Goffins were less inclined to interact with the test apparatus, those that did solved the presented tasks at a similar rate to the captive-bred birds.

Wild Goffins were also observed shaping sticks of different dimensions in order to create a series of tools which enabled them to eat sea mango seeds.

Egyptian vultures
When an Egyptian vulture (Neophron percnopterus) encounters a large egg, it takes a stone into its beak and forcefully throws it at the egg until the shell is broken, usually taking a few minutes. This behaviour, first reported in 1966, seems to be largely innate and is displayed by naïve individuals. Its origin could be related to the throwing of eggs; rounded (egg-like) stones are preferred to jagged ones.

In a small population in Bulgaria, Egyptian vultures use twigs to collect sheep wool for padding their nests. Although both twigs and wool can serve as nesting material, this appears to be deliberate tool use. The birds approached bits of discarded wool with a twig in their beak, which was then either used as a rake, to gather the wool into heaps, or to roll up the wool. Wool was collected only after shearing or simulated shearing of sheep had taken place, but not after wool had simply been deposited in sheep enclosures.

Fire-foraging raptors
In Australia the black kite (Milvus migrans), whistling kite (Haliastur sphenurus) and unrelated brown falcon (Falco berigora) are not only attracted to wildfires to source food, but will variously use their beaks or talons to carry burning sticks so as to spread fire, complicating human efforts to contain fires using firebreaks.

Owls
Burrowing owls (Athene cunicularia) frequently collect mammalian dung, which they use as a bait to attract dung beetles, a major item of prey.

Gulls
Gulls have been known to drop mollusc shells on paved and hard surfaces such as roads. Their dropping habits are similar to corvids in the sense that repeated drops allow gulls to have easier access towards their prey. Certain species (e.g. the herring gull) have exhibited tool use behaviour, using pieces of bread as bait to catch goldfish, for example.

Kelp gulls

Kelp gulls are one of the well-known gulls that have displayed prey-dropping. These gulls are known to learn their prey-dropping skills by studying other gulls around them, and are able to refine this behaviour to benefit themselves. They commonly break their prey on hard surfaces, such as rocks, asphalt, and even roofs of houses and cars. Kelp gulls normally drop black mussels, and drop-sites are normally chosen based on how well it would break the prey as well as the amount of kleptoparasites that are in the area, as other gulls may take the opportunity to steal an individuals’ prey. Dropping behaviour occurs at any time of year but is more prevalent in the winter during low-tide hours, most likely due to having more access to larger mussels. Kelp gulls will fly over 0.5 km to a preferred substrate on which to break their prey. Height from which the prey is dropped will increase after each drop of the prey. Once the prey is dropped, a gull will descend as quickly as possible to recover its prey. This is likely to prevent kleptoparasitism, which is very common in prey-dropping. On average, a kelp gull will descend at an average of 4 m/s in comparison to the prey’s fall of 5 m/s, which allows the gull to reach the ground about 0.5 seconds after the prey has landed onto the surface. Adult kelp gulls have a higher success rate of breaking and obtaining their prey while prey dropping than juvenile kelp gulls.

Western gulls

Western gulls are one of the many species of gulls that have been observed to drop their prey on the ground. A study observed that a major factor influencing dropping behaviour in these gulls had to do with the mass and size of the prey being dropped. When performing a study using different sizes of Washington clams, smaller clams were normally pecked at. The larger clams however were dropped unless they were too heavy to carry, usually exceeding 268 grams in weight. Drop behaviour differs between adult and immature western gulls. All adult western gulls that have been studied displayed prey dropping behaviour, and dropped from an average of 118 metres away from where they were originally retrieved. In the study, dropping occurred either over mudflats or a parking lot, which correlated with weight of the clams, which average clam weights were 106.7 g and 134.3 g respectively. Immature gulls meanwhile are much more clumsy with their dropping, and only 55% of juvenile western gulls that were observed displayed this behaviour. Juvenile gulls also did not seem to have a correlation between the weight of the clam and the height the clam was dropped at, though it is noted that the younger gulls seemed to drop their prey at much lower heights than their older peers. This could be evidence of juvenile gulls learning this behaviour through trial and error. The low height at which the clams are dropped may also result in the number of times the younger gulls had to drop their prey. Immature western gulls tend to drop their prey more frequently than the older gulls do, most likely due to inconsistency in drop height as well as the height of the drops. Unlike most birds who drop their prey, western gulls actually seem to prefer softer substrates over larger substrates when dropping their prey, and only seem to drop their prey on hard surfaces if their prey is heavier.

Black-headed gulls

In observations made in Central Europe, a two-year-old black-headed gull was seen taking a small swan mussel about 60 feet up into the air to drop on an asphalt road. It is unknown how successful the gull was seeing as a nearby crow stole the mussel. This was the first time prey-dropping was recorded in this species of gulls. It is likely that this behaviour is not common in this species of gull, as there is no other evidence of black-headed gulls dropping prey. It is more likely that this observation was due to the fact that there was a large group of hood crows during this study, and it may be that the gull observed was mimicking the prey-dropping behaviour of the hood crows nearby. This may be evident seeing as after the gull had dropped the mussel, it made no move to try and grab it for another drop. However, due to the fact that it was not only a single black-headed gull that was observed, but also a young bird, it is possible that successful prey-dropping may occur in other members of this species.

Sooty gulls

In 2009, two sooty gulls near Hamata, Egypt, were seen using prey-dropping behaviour on a strip of coral reef. Unlike other gulls, the gulls only flew up about 6 m and broke molluscs in one drop. All drops were successful.

Herons
The green heron (Butorides virescens) and its sister species the striated heron (Butorides striata) have been recorded using food (bread crusts), insects, leaves, and other small objects as bait to attract fish, which they then capture and eat.

In reptiles
Tool use by American alligators and mugger crocodiles has been documented. During the breeding season, birds such as herons and egrets look for sticks to build their nests. Alligators and crocodiles collect sticks to use as bait to catch birds. The crocodilian positions itself near a rookery, partially submerges with the sticks balanced on its head, and when a bird approaches to take the stick, it springs its trap. This stick displaying strategy is the first known case of a predator not only using an object as a lure, but also taking into account the seasonal behaviour of its prey.

In fish

Several species of wrasses have been observed using rocks as anvils to crack bivalve (scallops, urchins and clams) shells. It was first filmed in an orange-dotted tuskfish (Choerodon anchorago) in 2009 by Giacomo Bernardi. The fish fans sand to unearth the bivalve, takes it into its mouth, swims several metres to a rock which it uses as an anvil by smashing the mollusc apart with sideward thrashes of the head. This behaviour has been recorded in a blackspot tuskfish (Choerodon schoenleinii) on Australia's Great Barrier Reef, yellowhead wrasse (Halichoeres garnoti) in Florida and a six-bar wrasse (Thalassoma hardwicke) in an aquarium setting. These species are at opposite ends of the phylogenetic tree in this family, so this behaviour may be a deep-seated trait in all wrasses.

It has been reported that freshwater stingrays use water as a tool by manipulating their bodies to direct a flow of water and extract food trapped amongst plants.

Prior to laying their eggs on a vertical rock face, male and female whitetail major damselfish clean the site by sand-blasting it. The fish pick up sand in their mouths and spit it against the rock face. Then they fan the area with their fins. Finally they remove the sand grains that remain stuck to the rock face by picking them off with their mouths.

Banded acara (Bujurquina vittata), South American cichlids, lay their eggs on a loose leaf. The male and female of a mating pair often "test" leaves before spawning: they pull and lift and turn candidate leaves, possibly trying to select leaves that are easy to move. After spawning, both parents guard the eggs. When disturbed, the parent acara often seize one end of the egg-carrying leaf in their mouth and drag it to deeper and safer locations.

Archerfish are found in the tropical mangrove swamps of India and Australasia. They approach the surface, take aim at insects that sit on plants above the surface, squirt a jet of water at them, and grab them after the insects have been knocked off into the water. The jet of water is formed by the action of the tongue, which presses against a groove in the roof of the mouth. Some archerfish can hit insects up to 1.5 m above the water surface. They use
more water, which gives more force to the impact, when aiming at larger prey. Some triggerfish (e.g. Pseudobalistes fuscus) blow water to turn sea urchins over and expose their more vulnerable ventral side. Whether these later examples can be classified as tool use depends on which definition is being followed because there is no intermediate or manipulated object, however, they are examples of highly specialised natural adaptations.

In invertebrates

Cephalopods

At least four veined octopus (Amphioctopus marginatus) individuals were witnessed retrieving coconut shells, manipulating them, stacking them, transporting them some distance (up to 20 metres), and then reassembling them to use as a shelter. The octopuses use coconut shells discarded by humans which have eventually settled in the ocean. They probe their arms down to loosen the mud, then rotate the shells out. After turning the shells so the open side faces upwards, the octopuses blow jets of mud out of the bowl before extending their arms around the shell—or if they have two halves, stacking them first, one inside the other. They then stiffen their legs and move away in a manner which has been called "stilt-walking". The octopuses eventually use the shells as a protective shelter in areas where little other shelter exists. If they just have one half, they simply turn it over and hide underneath. But if they are lucky enough to have retrieved two halves, they assemble them back into the original closed coconut form and sneak inside. This behaviour has been filmed. The authors of the research article claimed this behaviour falls under the definition of tool use because the shells are carried for later use. However, this argument remains contested by a number of other biologists who state that the shells actually provide continuous protection from abundant bottom-dwelling predators in their home range.

Octopuses deliberately place stones, shells and even bits of broken bottle to form a wall that constricts the aperture to the den, a type of tool use.

In laboratory studies, Octopus mercatoris, a small pygmy species of octopus, has been observed to block its lair using a plastic Lego brick.

Smaller individuals of the common blanket octopus (Tremoctopus violaceus) hold the tentacles of the Portuguese man o' war, to whose poison they are immune, both as protection and as a method of capturing prey.

Insects
Ants of the species Dorymyrmex bicolor pick up stones and other small objects with their mandibles and drop them down the vertical entrances of rival colonies, allowing workers to forage for food without competition.

Several species of ant are known to use substrate debris such as mud and leaves to transport water to their nest. A study in 2017 reported that when two species of Aphaenogaster ant are offered natural and artificial objects as tools for this activity, they choose items with a good soaking capacity. The ants develop a preference for artificial tools that cannot be found in their natural environment, indicating plasticity in their tool-use behaviour.

Hunting wasps of the genus Prionyx use weights (such as compacted sediment or a small pebble) to settle sand surrounding a recently provisioned burrow containing eggs and live prey in order to camouflage and seal the entrance. The wasp vibrates its wing muscles with an audible buzz while holding the weight in its mandibles, and applies the weight to the sand surrounding its burrow, causing the sand to vibrate and settle. Another hunting wasp, Ammophila, uses pebbles to close burrow entrances.

Some species of crickets construct acoustic baffles from the leaves of plants to amplify sounds they make for communication during mating. It was in 1975 that scientists first observed  and two other species of South African chirping crickets doing this.

Insects can also learn to use tools. A study in 2017 showed that bumblebees of the species Bombus terrestris learned to move a small wooden ball to the goal in order to get sucrose reward.

See also
 Animal cognition
 Animal-computer interaction
 Bird intelligence
 Fish intelligence
 Cephalopod intelligence
 Cetacean intelligence
 Elephant intelligence
 Structures built by animals
 Hermit crab (shell, anemone)
 Cow Tools, a cartoon which attempted to parody this topic

References

Further reading

External links
 Chimpanzee making and using a termite "fishing rod"
 Chimpanzee using tool to break into beehive to get honey
 Crow making a tool by bending wire to snag food
 Various tool use by birds
 Fish using an anvil to break open prey
 Dolphin using a marine sponge to protect its rostrum
 Mandrill using a tool to clean under its nails
 New Caledonian crows picking up an object with a tool and transporting both

Animal intelligence
Ethology
 
Articles containing video clips